The 2016 German Open was a men's tennis tournament played on outdoor red clay courts. It was the 110th edition of the German Open and part of the ATP World Tour 500 series of the 2016 ATP World Tour. It took place at the Am Rothenbaum in Hamburg, Germany, from July 11 through 17, 2016.

Points and prize money

Points distribution

Prize money

Singles main draw entrants

Seeds 

 1 Rankings are as of June 27, 2016

Other entrants 
The following players received wildcards into the singles main draw:
  Florian Mayer 
  Marvin Möller 
  Louis Wessels

The following players received entry from the qualifying draw:
  Steven Diez 
  Thiago Monteiro 
  Daniil Medvedev 
  Jan Šátral

Withdrawals
Before the tournament
  Kevin Anderson →replaced by  Mikhail Youzhny
  Roberto Bautista Agut →replaced by  Stéphane Robert
  Pablo Carreño Busta →replaced by   Jan-Lennard Struff
  Federico Delbonis →replaced by  Thomas Fabbiano
  Fabio Fognini →replaced by  Igor Sijsling
  Malek Jaziri →replaced by  Carlos Berlocq
  Juan Mónaco →replaced by  Máximo González
  Guido Pella →replaced by  Gerald Melzer
  Lucas Pouille →replaced by  Mischa Zverev
  Lukáš Rosol →replaced by  Kenny de Schepper
  Dominic Thiem →replaced by  Renzo Olivo
  Jiří Veselý →replaced by  Grega Žemlja

Doubles main draw entrants

Seeds 

 Rankings are as of June 27, 2016

Other entrants 
The following pairs received wildcards into the doubles main draw:
  Andre Begemann /  Jan-Lennard Struff
  Alexander Zverev /  Mischa Zverev

The following pair received entry from the qualifying draw:
  Kenny de Schepper /  Axel Michon

The following pair received entry as lucky losers:
  Daniel Masur /  Cedrik-Marcel Stebe

Withdrawals 
Before the tournament
  Florian Mayer (illness)

Champions

Singles 

  Martin Kližan def.  Pablo Cuevas, 6–1, 6–4

Doubles 

  Henri Kontinen /  John Peers def.  Daniel Nestor /  Aisam-ul-Haq Qureshi, 7–5, 6–3

References

External links